Yeni Günəşli is a settlement in the municipality in the Surakhany raion of Baku, Azerbaijan.

References

Populated places in Baku